Coelostathma cocoana is a species of moth of the family Tortricidae. It is found in Costa Rica.

References

Moths described in 2001
Endemic fauna of Costa Rica
Sparganothini